FCH domain only 1 is a protein that in humans is encoded by the FCHO1 gene.

References

Further reading